Varabad (also Romanized as Varābād and Warābād) is a village in Salehan Rural District, in the Central District of Khomeyn County, Markazi Province, Iran. At the 2006 census, its population was 881, in 271 families.

References 

Populated places in Khomeyn County